Lygropia imparalis is a moth in the family Crambidae. It is found in the Dominican Republic, Puerto Rico and Cuba.

References

Lygropia